The Dutch Eerste Divisie in the 1984–85 season was contested by 18 teams, one more than in the previous season. This was due to RKC Waalwijk entering from the amateurs. SC Heracles won the championship.

New entrants
Entered from amateur football
 RKC Waalwijk
Relegated from the 1983–84 Eredivisie
 DS '79
 Helmond Sport
 Willem II

League standings

Promotion competition
In the promotion competition, four period winners (the best teams during each of the four quarters of the regular competition) played for promotion to the Eredivisie.

See also
 1984–85 Eredivisie
 1984–85 KNVB Cup

References
Netherlands - List of final tables (RSSSF)

Eerste Divisie seasons
2
Neth